William Jones was a Welsh lawyer and politician who sat in the House of Commons  between 1647 and 1648.

Jones was the son of Sir William Jones  and his wife Margaret Griffith, daughter of Griffith ap John Griffith of Kevenamulch, Carnarvonshire. His father was a judge and MP. Jones was a barrister and he and his brother Charles were joint prothonotaries and clerks of the crown for Denbighshire and Montgomeryshire but surrendered the positions in November 1636. In 1647, Jones was elected Member of Parliament for Beaumaris in the Long Parliament. He was excluded from sitting under Pride's Purge in the following year.

Jones became recorder of Shrewsbury on 1 March 1655 and held the position until 1660.

References

 

Year of birth missing
Year of death missing
Members of the Parliament of England (pre-1707) for constituencies in Wales
17th-century Welsh politicians
English MPs 1640–1648
Members of the Parliament of England for Beaumaris